Ihor Volodymyrovych Rutkovskyi (born 28 March 1963) is an association footballer from the former Soviet Union.

International career
In 1983, Rutkovskyi took part in the Summer Spartakiad of the Peoples of the USSR in the team of Ukrainian SSR.

References

External links
 
 Rutkovsky at footballfacts.ru
 Rutkovsky at ukr-football.org.ua

1963 births
Living people
Footballers from Zhytomyr
Soviet footballers
Ukrainian footballers
Association football goalkeepers
FC Polissya Zhytomyr players
FC SKA-Karpaty Lviv players
Ukrainian First League players
Ukrainian Second League players